Robert E. Lee Hotel or Hotel Robert E. Lee or variations may refer to:

Robert E. Lee Hotel (San Diego, California), listed on the National Register of Historic Places in San Diego County, California
Robert E. Lee Hotel (St. Louis, Missouri), listed on the National Register of Historic Places in St. Louis County, Missouri
Hotel Robert E. Lee (Winston-Salem, North Carolina), once the tallest building in Winston-Salem
Robert E. Lee Hotel (San Antonio, Texas), listed on the National Register of Historic Places in Bexar County, Texas